Hoboken City Hall, is located in Hoboken, Hudson County, New Jersey, United States. The building was designed by Francis G. Himpler and was built in 1883. The building was added to the National Register of Historic Places on January 1, 1976. The building is a Second Empire structure modified to a Beaux Art Classicism design.

See also
National Register of Historic Places listings in Hudson County, New Jersey

References

Beaux-Arts architecture in New Jersey
Buildings and structures in Hoboken, New Jersey
City and town halls in New Jersey
City and town halls on the National Register of Historic Places in New Jersey
Government buildings completed in 1883
National Register of Historic Places in Hudson County, New Jersey
New Jersey Register of Historic Places